Alfred Delacour or Alfred-Charlemagne Delacour, real name Pierre-Alfred Lartigue, (3 September 1817  – 31 March 1883 ) was a 19th-century French playwright and librettist.

Biography 
In addition to his occupation as a physician, which he practised from 1841, Delacour turned progressively to the theatre. He collaborated with Eugène Labiche and Clairville for several vaudevilles

Titles and decorations 
 Knight of the Legion of honour (7 August 1867 decree) His entry on the Base Léonore wrongly calls him Alfred-Charlemagne which was his pen name.

Plays 
Le Courrier de Lyon (1850) was one of Delacour's noted plays. It was written together with Eugène Moreau and Paul Siraudin. The play was based on the story of Joseph Lesurques, an innocent man who was executed after he was mistaken for the leader of a gang who brutally murdered a courier. Aside from his collaborations with Labiche and Clairville, Delacour also worked with Lambert Thiboust on Le diable (1880), a French drama. Some of the playwright's vaudeville plays inspired Clement Scott and Arthur Matthison's Great Divorce Case (1876) and James Albery's The Pink Dominos (1877).
1847: L'Hospitalité d'une grisette by Mathieu Barthélemy Thouin and Delacour
1849: E. H. by Eugène Moreau, Paul Siraudin and Delacour 
1850: Le Courrier de Lyon by Eugène Moreau, Paul Siraudin and Delacour, Théâtre de la Gaîté
1851: La fille qui trompe son mari by Eugène Moreau and Delacour
1852: Paris qui dort by Lambert-Thiboust and Delacour, Théâtre des Variétés
1855: Un bal d'auvergnats by Paul Siraudin, Delacour and Lambert-Thiboust, Théâtre du Palais-Royal
1856: La Queue de la poële by Paul Siraudin and Delacour, Théâtre du Palais-Royal
1858: Deux merles blancs by Eugène Labiche and Delacour, Théâtre des Variétés
1859: Un mari à la porte by Delacour and Léon Morand, opérette in one act with music by Offenbach; Bouffes-Parisiens, Salle Lacaze
1861: Les Voisins de Molinchart by Marc-Michel and Delacour
1862: Les Petits Oiseaux by Eugène Labiche and Delacour, Théâtre du Vaudeville
1864: La Cagnotte by Eugène Labiche and Delacour, Théâtre du Palais-Royal
1864: Le Point de mire by Eugène Labiche and Delacour, Théâtre de la Cour
1864: Les Femmes sérieuses by Paul Siraudin, Alfred and Ernest Blum, Théâtre du Palais-Royal
1865: L'Homme qui manque le coche by Eugène Labiche and Delacour, Théâtre des Variétés
1865: Le Voyage en Chine by Eugène Labiche and Delacour, Opéra-Comique
1875: Le Procès Veauradieux by Alfred Hennequin and Delacour.
1876: Le roi dort by Eugène Labiche and Delacour, Théâtre des Variétés
1876: Les Dominos roses by Alfred Hennequin and Delacour, Théâtre du Vaudeville

Adaptations for television 
 1964: Célimare le bien-aimé, by Delacour and Eugène Labiche (1863), television film by René Lucot
 2009: La Cagnotte, by Delacour and Eugène Labiche (1864), television film by Philippe Monnier.

Bibliography 
 Hippolyte Minier, Le théâtre à Bordeaux, étude historique suivi de la nomenclature des auteurs dramatiques bordelais et de leurs ouvrages, établie en collaboration avec Jules Delpit, Bordeaux, 1883, (p. 53)

References

External links 
 Alfred Delacour on Data.bnf.fr
 

19th-century French dramatists and playwrights
French opera librettists
Chevaliers of the Légion d'honneur
Writers from Bordeaux
1817 births
1883 deaths